Henry Hansen may refer to:

Henry Oliver Hansen (1919–1945), United States Marine in World War II
Henry Paul Hansen (1907–1989), American palynologist
Henry Hansen (cyclist) (1902–1985), Danish cyclist
Henry Hansen (footballer) (1899-1952), Danish footballer

See also
Harry Hansen (disambiguation)